Dreiliņi is a village in Stopiņi Parish, Ropaži Municipality in the Vidzeme region and the Riga Planning Region of Latvia. From 2009 until 2021, it was part of the former Stopiņi Municipality.

Artist Burkards Dzenis was born in Dreiliņi.

References 

Towns and villages in Latvia
Ropaži Municipality
Kreis Riga
Vidzeme